Ripstop polyester is similar to ripstop nylon but differs in the chemical composition of the fibres used to weave it. It is used in manufacturing paragliding canopies and stunt kites.

References

Plastics
Polyesters